Eilema kingdoni is a moth of the subfamily Arctiinae first described by Arthur Gardiner Butler in 1877. It is found on Mayotte and Madagascar.

References

Moths described in 1877
kingdoni